Making More Memories is the thirty-ninth solo studio album by American country music singer-songwriter Loretta Lynn. It was released on February 8, 1994, by Nashville Sound. It was only sold for a limited time at Loretta Lynn's Ranch, Ernest Tubb Record Stores, and at live appearances by Lynn. It was also available for mail order through the Loretta Lynn Fan Club.

Background
Lynn only promoted the album once, during a live show on TNN on May 18, 1994. The album sold approximately 2,000 copies. A music video for "We Need to Make More Memories" was filmed on location at Lynn's home in Hurricane Mills, Tennessee. This was Lynn's first solo music video and features her entire immediate family.

Lynn dedicated the album to her husband, Doolittle. The album's cover shows Lynn with her grand-daughter, Megan.

Track listing

References

Loretta Lynn albums
1994 albums